Buck Knives is an American knife manufacturer founded in Mountain Home, Idaho and now located in Post Falls, Idaho. The company has a long history through five generations of the Buck family from 1902 to the present day. Buck Knives primarily manufactures sport and field knives and is credited with inventing the "folding hunting knife" and popularizing it to such a degree that the term "buck knife" has become synonymous with folding lockback knives, including those made by other manufacturers.

History

Company origins
Hoyt H. Buck became a blacksmith's apprentice in Kansas in 1899 at the age of 10. He learned to make knives and at 13, in 1902, developed a method to heat-treat steel for hoes and other tools so that they would hold an edge longer. Hoyt left Kansas in 1907 for the American northwest and eventually enlisted in the United States Navy. He made his first knife in 1902 in Mountain Home, Idaho. Hoyt made each knife by hand, using worn-out file blades as raw material. Collectors call these early knives "four strikes" as each of the letters in BUCK was struck with an individual letter stamp.  In 1961, marking was replaced by a one-piece stamp.

When the United States entered WW2, the government asked the public for donations of fixed-bladed knives to arm the troops. Upon learning that there were not enough knives for soldiers, Hoyt Buck bought an anvil, forge, and grinder to set up a blacksmith shop in the basement of his church. Hoyt later explained, "I didn't have any knives [to offer], but I sure knew how to make them".

After World War II, Hoyt and his son, Al, moved to San Diego and set up shop as "H.H. Buck & Son" in 1947. These early knives were handmade and more expensive than a typical mass-produced knife. Hoyt Buck made 25 knives a week until his death in 1949. In the 1950s, the company began manufacturing on a much larger scale and marketed through dealers as opposed to direct mail.

The Model 110

On April 18, 1963, two years after incorporating, the Buck board of directors authorized development of a new folding utility and hunting knife. The new design featured a sturdy locking mechanism and a substantial clip point blade suitable for butchering and skinning large game. This became the famous Buck Model 110 Folding Hunter.

The Buck Model 110 has a 3–inch blade, a high-tension lock, and a low-pressure release; the handles are typically wood with bolsters of heavy-gauge brass. Introduced in 1964, it was one of the first lockback folding knives considered strong enough to do the work of a fixed-blade knife. Its debut revolutionized hunting knives, rapidly becoming one of the most popular knives ever made, with some 15 million Model 110 knives produced since 1964. Before 1981, the specially heat treated stainless steel used was 440C, and from 1981 to 1992 the company used 425M steel. Since 1993, Buck has mostly used 420HC stainless steel for Model 110 blades, although CPM S30V steel has also been used for some production runs. Its design is one of the most imitated knife patterns in the world.

In 2017, Buck introduced the Buck 110 Auto Knife (Model #0110BRSA-B) an automatic version of the 110, designed for one handed use.  The knife is a heavy duty factory built switchblade which opens with the depression of a button built into the knife handle.

The Buck Model 112 "RANGER", a slightly smaller version of the 110, has a three-inch blade and is better suited for carrying both respect to the knife laws of some jurisdictions that limit pocket carry to 3" and in terms of weight for the classic metal bolster editions.

In 2018, Buck introduced two new lightweight editions of the 110, a thick-handled FRN (fiberglass reinforced nylon) version called the LT, and a thin-handled FRN version called the Slim; both FRN versions rely on the FRN by itself for handle strength without reinforcing steel backplates, with the LT sturdier for use in field dressing medium and big game; it comes with the classic Buck belt sheath. The Slim version dispenses with any included sheath, since it incorporates a deep carry, stainless steel pocket clip (a first for any 110) which is reversible from side-to-side (but not top-to-bottom). The Slim also includes thumbstuds for one-handed opening, bringing the original 110 into the modern era in terms of light weight and common convenience features.

Models

There are many different models of Buck knives, including:
the Buck Model 055 "the 55" 
the Buck Model 110 Folding Hunter
the Buck Model 110 slim pro
the Buck Model 110 lt
the Buck Model 347 vantage large
the Buck Model 342 vantage small
the Buck Model 341 vantage
the Buck Model 722 spitfire
the Buck Model 726 spitfire mini
the Buck Model 418 vertex
the Buck Model 418 vertex "pilot run" cleaver and drop point blades 400 of each blade type
the Buck Model 500 duke
the Buck Model 501 squire
the Buck Model 503 prince
the Buck Model 112 Folding Ranger
the Buck Model 102 Woodsman
the Buck Model 103 skinner
the Buck Model 105 pathfinder
the Buck Model 112 Ranger
the Buck Model 113 Ranger skinner
the Buck Model 119 Special
the Buck Model 120 General
the Buck Model 124 Frontiersman
the Buck 301 BKS Stockman
the Buck Model 303 cadet
the Buck Model 501
the Buck model 401 Kalinga
the Buck Vanguard
the Buck Model 916 bowie

Recent developments
In 1984, Buck introduced a survival knife with a hollow handle for storage and a 7.5 inch blade with a serrated spine and prongs so the knife could double as a grappling hook. Dubbed the Buckmaster (Model 184), it was marketed to the military and fans of the Rambo films of the 1980s. The Buckmaster was soon followed by the M9 Bayonet manufactured for the US Army, with an initial order of 315,600.

In 1992–1993, Buck introduced the Nighthawk, a fixed-blade knife with a 6.5 inch blade and a black handle made of Zytel for an ergonomic grip. This knife [Best M9] was submitted to the United States Marines for evaluation for use by the USMC.

In 2000, due to a demand from major retailers to reduce prices, Buck opened a plant in China. Imports to the US from this plant had reached a high of 30 percent at one time, but have dropped to 13 percent with the majority of these knives going to large retailers as opposed to sporting goods stores or knife shops.

In 2005, the company relocated to Post Falls, Idaho. Leaders of the San Diego business community considered this move a blow to San Diego County's economic landscape and a symbol of the state of California's problems in attracting and keeping businesses.

Buck Knives has collaborated with different custom knifemakers such as Tom Mayo, Mick Strider, David Yellowhorse and Rob Simonich.

Al and Chuck Buck were inducted into the Blade Magazine Cutlery Hall of Fame at the 1982 and 1996 Blade Shows respectively in Atlanta, Georgia in recognition for the impact that their designs and Company has made upon the cutlery industry. Buck's heat treater, Paul Bos who heat treats knives for other custom makers and production companies at Buck's facility was inducted into the Hall of Fame in 2011.

Products
Buck Knives is an American manufacturer of different styles of knives including the first successful folding lock-blade, introduced in 1964. Folding lock-blade knives and "Buck Knife" thereby became strongly linked in the mind of the US public, and the Buck design was much imitated, so that a Buck knife has come to mean any folding lock-blade design, even while Buck Knife is a trademark and not limited to folding lock-blades.

Buck licensed art knives
Buck Knives has produced art knives for and under license with other companies and organizations such as: the National Rifle Association, the Boy Scouts of America, Colt Firearms, Anheuser-Busch (Budweiser), Republic Studios, Harley Davidson, Indian Motorcycles, Ford Motor Company, Chevy Truck, Elvis Presley Estate, John Wayne Estate, Roy Clark, Purina, NHRA, Boeing, Monroe Auto and Ducks Unlimited. Additionally Buck has worked with many commissions to produce art knives for state anniversaries (Texas Sesquicentennial), state agencies (West Virginia State Police), commemorations (Battle Iowa) or celebrations (Apple Harvest Festival).

In popular culture
In the 1984 film Red Dawn, a carton of Buck Knives was one of the survival items the future Wolverines took with them when they were heading for the mountains. Patrick Swayze's character Jed Eckert keeps a Buck Folding Hunter in a sheath on his belt.
In the popular television show The Dukes of Hazzard both of the main protagonists carry Buck Model 110 Folding Hunter knives, and are seen making frequent use of them throughout the course of the series. In various episodes, the Duke boys use their knives both as general tools (e.g. cutting rope, whittling branches), and to help get them out of adverse situations poised by their adversaries (e.g. puncturing the tires of their foes.) It is worth noting that due to network regulations of the 1970s-1980s, as well as the general "family-friendly" nature of the show, at no point did the characters use their knives as weapons against another person.
In the Scream film series, Ghostface's primary weapon is a Buck 120 e.
On the poster for Friday the 13th: The Final Chapter, a Buck 120 knife is in the eye hole of Jason's hockey mask.
A drawing of the Model 110 appears on the cover art of the indie rock band The Front Bottoms sophomore album, Talon of the Hawk.
In the television show Longmire, Sheriff Walt Longmire (Robert Taylor), Sheriff of Absaroka County, Wyoming carries a Buck 110 Folding Hunter which he uses in almost every episode.  In the pilot episode Sheriff Longmire is involved in a rollover accident.  He uses his Buck 110 to cut the shoulder harness to free himself from his wrecked Ford Bronco.  In subsequent episodes Sheriff Longmire regularly uses his Buck 110 to pick up items of evidence at crime scenes.
In the film Kill Bill Vol. 2, The Bride kills the nurse in the hospital with a Buck 112 she pulls from the belt of the other man she just killed.
In the HBO series The Last of Us the main character Joel (Pedro Pascal) is seen carrying a buck knife in several episodes, most notably episode 7 when he uses it to kill several men.

See also
 Knife making
 Gerber Legendary Blades
 List of companies based in Idaho

References

External links

 Buck Knives official site

Knife manufacturing companies
Goods manufactured in the United States
Post Falls, Idaho
Companies based in Idaho
1902 establishments in California